Baltasar Albéniz (6 January 1905 in Eibar – 29 November 1978 in Pamplona) was a Spanish football manager. He coached Real Madrid twice (1946–1947 and 1950–1951), winning the 1950–51 Copa del Rey. He later defeated Real Madrid in the 1957–58 Copa final as the head coach of Athletic Bilbao.  He also coached RCD Espanyol, CA Osasuna, and Real Sociedad.

References

External links
 
 

1905 births
1978 deaths
Spanish footballers
Footballers from Eibar
Association football defenders
Deportivo Alavés players
Real Sociedad footballers
Arenas Club de Getxo footballers
Spanish football managers
RC Celta de Vigo managers
Deportivo Alavés managers
Real Madrid CF managers
RCD Espanyol managers
CA Osasuna managers
Real Sociedad managers
UD Las Palmas managers
Moghreb Tétouan managers